Farzana Raja is a Pakistani politician who served as chair of the Benazir Income Support Programme and has been a Member of the National Assembly of Pakistan.

Early life and education
She was born on 2 January 1970. She received her early education from  Government High School in Chaklala, Rawalpindi and completed her college education from Viqar-u-Nisa College in Rawalpindi before obtaining a bachelor's degree from Punjab University in 1989.

Political career 

She was elected to the Provincial Assembly of Punjab as a candidate of Pakistan Peoples Party on a reserved seat for women in 2002 Pakistani general election.

She was elected to the National Assembly of Pakistan as a candidate of Pakistan Peoples Party on a reserved seat for women from Punjab in 2008 Pakistani general election.

She became chairwoman of the Benazir Income Support Programme in 2008.

In 2012, she was inducted into the federal cabinet of Prime Minister Yousuf Raza Gilani without portfolio and was give the status of a federal minister. She was retained in the federal cabinet of incoming Prime Minister Raja Pervez Ashraf.

References

Pakistan People's Party MNAs
1970 births
Living people
University of the Punjab alumni
Women members of the National Assembly of Pakistan
People from Gujar Khan
Farzana Raja Was Chairman BISP